CJ van der Walt (born 12 February 1997) is a South African cricketer. In 2020, he signed to play for the Northern Knights in Ireland. He made his Twenty20 debut for Northern Knights in the 2020 Inter-Provincial Trophy on 20 August 2020.

References

External links
 

1997 births
Living people
South African cricketers
Northern Knights cricketers
Place of birth missing (living people)